Congress of Visegrád may refer to:

 Congress of Visegrád (1335)
 Congress of Visegrád (1339)